Hostages is a HBO documentary series directed by Joshua Bennett, Maro Chermayeff, Jeff Dupre, Abbas Motlagh and Sam Pollard which was debuted 28 September 2022 on HBO Max.

The four-part series explores events of the 1979 Iranian revolution before and after the 1979–81 Iran hostage crisis and the crisis itself, and examines other dimensions of the crisis like its impact on 1980 U.S. presidential elections as well as the path of the Iranian revolution.

Some footages used in the series are never seen before.

Cast
The series consists of footages from Iranian revolutionaries, hostage-takers and other Islamic Republic officials, as well as interviews with involved people like Mohsen Sazegara, Abolhassan Banisadr, Masoumeh Ebtekar, and some of the hostages including Michael J. Metrinko, John W. Limbert, and Victor L. Tomseth.

References

External links 

 

2020s American documentary television series
Films about Mohammad Reza Pahlavi
Cultural depictions of Ruhollah Khomeini
HBO original programming
Documentaries about politics
Documentaries about historical events
2022 American television series debuts
Works about the Iranian Revolution